Janet may refer to:

Names
 Janet (given name)
 Janet (French singer) (1939–2011)

Surname
 Charles Janet (1849–1932), French engineer, inventor and biologist, known for the Left Step periodic table
 Jules Janet (1861–1945), French psychologist and psychotherapist
 Maurice Janet (1888–1983), French mathematician
 Paul Janet (1823–1899), French philosopher and writer
 Pierre Janet (1859–1947), French psychologist, philosopher and psychotherapist
 Roberto Janet (born 1986), Cuban hammer thrower

Other uses 
 Janet, Alberta, a Canadian hamlet
 Janet (airline), a military transport fleet known for servicing the US Air Force "Area 51" facility
 JANET, a high-speed network for the UK research and education community
 Janet (album), by Janet Jackson
 Janet (video), a video compilation by Janet Jackson
 Janet, a character in the TV series The Good Place
 Hurricane Janet, 1955
 Janet, a character in the video game Brawl Stars